Mark Jason Miller (born September 17, 1971) is an American kickboxer who competes in the heavyweight division.

Biography and career

Early life
Miller grew up in Pittsburgh, Pennsylvania and became involved with martial arts through his love of Bruce Lee and Chuck Norris films. His father sent him to a boxing gym at a young age, and he also practiced Tang Soo Do, Hapkido, Uechi-ryu and Taekwondo as a child. He began competing in amateur boxing at the age of 18.

He later began Muay Thai and trained and fought in Thailand.

Career
Mark Miller made his debut in the K-1 promotion in August 2000 at K-1 USA Championships 2000, where he lost to Tommy Glanville via unanimous decision. He re-matched with Glanville in May the following year at K-1 World Grand Prix 2001 Preliminary USA, and avenged his loss with a split decision victory. In February 2002, he took part in the Grand Prix at K-1 World Grand Prix 2002 Preliminary North America and lost to Canada's Giuseppe DeNatale in the first round. This was to be his last bout in K-1.

In 2006, Miller was set to compete in a bout for the S-1 Muay Thai promotion in Miami, Florida. However, he failed the Florida Athletic Commission's medical test due to a heart condition. According to the specialists, Miller was having a fifteen percent cardiac output along with an enlarged heart. In 2007, he had heart surgery due to the condition.

He made his return to the ring on May 28, 2011 at United Glory 14: 2010-2011 World Series Finals in Moscow, Russia against Nikolaj Falin. Miller knocked Falin out with a right hook nine seconds into the first round. Following this match, Miller joined the famous Golden Glory gym in the Netherlands.

He faced Koichi Pettas at Glory 2: Brussels on October 6, 2012 in Brussels, Belgium and lost via KO in the second round.

Kickboxing record 

|-  bgcolor="#FFBBBB" 
| 2012-10-06 ||Loss ||align=left| Koichi Pettas || Glory 2: Brussels || Brussels, Belgium ||KO (Right Cross) || 2 || 
|-  bgcolor="#FFBBBB"
| 2012-03-23 || Loss ||align=left| Sergei Kharitonov || United Glory 15 || Moscow, Russia || KO (Right Hook) || 1 || 1:59
|-  bgcolor="#CCFFCC"
| 2011-05-28 || Win ||align=left| Nikolaj Falin || United Glory 14: 2010-2011 World Series Finals || Moscow, Russia || KO (right hook) || 1 || 0:09
|-  bgcolor="#FFBBBB"
| 2002-02-09 || Loss ||align=left| Giuseppe DeNatale || K-1 World Grand Prix 2002 Preliminary North America, Quarter Finals || Milwaukee, Wisconsin, USA || TKO || 2 || 2:07
|-  bgcolor="#FFBBBB"
| 2001-08-11 || Loss ||align=left| Dewey Cooper || K-1 World Grand Prix 2001 in Las Vegas || Las Vegas, Nevada, USA || TKO || 2 || 
|-  bgcolor="#CCFFCC"
| 2001-05-05 || Win ||align=left| Tommy Glanville || K-1 World Grand Prix 2001 Preliminary USA || Las Vegas, Nevada, USA || Decision (split) || 5 || 3:00
|-  bgcolor="#FFBBBB"
| 2000-08-05 || Loss ||align=left| Tommy Glanville || K-1 USA Championships 2000 || Las Vegas, Nevada, USA || Decision (unanimous) || 3 || 3:00
|-
| colspan=9 | Legend:

Personal life
Miller's memoir Pain Don't Hurt: Fighting Inside and Outside the Ring was published in 2014 by Ecco Press, an imprint of HarperCollins curated by chef and author Anthony Bourdain. The book, co-written with Miller's longtime corner woman Shelby Jones, tells of his origins in a troubled family, heart surgery, struggles with addiction, and his kickboxing career. Kirkus Reviews described the book as "thoughtful but unsentimental" and "a force to be reckoned with".

References

External links
 Fighters Profile

1971 births
Living people
American male kickboxers
Kickboxers from Pennsylvania
Heavyweight kickboxers
American Muay Thai practitioners
Sportspeople from Pittsburgh